Torkeh-ye Olya (also Romanized as Torkeh-ye ‘Olyā) is a village in Palanganeh Rural District, in the Central District of Javanrud County, Kermanshah Province, Iran. At the 2006 census, its population was 14, in 5 families.

References 

Populated places in Javanrud County